Sujana Bai Bhonsle or Sujan Bai Bhonsle was the wife of Ekoji II, the Maratha ruler of Thanjavur of the Bhonsle dynasty. She ruled the state from the death of her husband in 1737 until she was deposed in 1738.

Reign 
Sujana Bai ascended the throne on the death of her husband Ekoji II in 1737 and ruled the state for a year. Her reign is notable for intrigues of Sayyid who held the actual power behind the throne. In the end, taking matters onto her own hands she drove out the pretender Katturaja. Katturaja sought the help of the French and invaded Thanjavur. Sujana Bai was deposed and Katturaja ascended the throne as Shahuji II.

References 

 'The Maratha Rajas of Tanjore' by K.R.Subramanian, 1928.

History of Thanjavur
Indian female royalty
18th-century Indian women
18th-century Indian people